Heywood is a masculine given name. Notable people with the name include:

 Heywood "Woody" Allen (born 1935), United States comedian, movie director, and jazz clarinetist
 Heywood Banks, United States comedian
 Heywood Broun (1888–1939), United States journalist
 Heywood Hale Broun (1918–2001), United States journalist
 Heywood L. Edwards (1905–1941), United States naval officer
 Heywood Gould (born 1942), United States screenwriter
 Heywood Sumner (1853–1940), an English painter and antiquary
 Heywood J. Ward, British writer, comedian and philanthropist

Fictional characters 

 Heywood R. Floyd, character in works by Arthur C. Clarke
 Heywood Jablome, pseudonym used by prankster

Masculine given names
English masculine given names